Ahmad Alan al-Iwisat (born 28 September 1982) is a Palestinian former national football team player. He is a striker and has 2 caps for the national team. He was born in Jerusalem.

See also
Football in Palestine
List of football clubs in Palestine

References

External links

Palestinian footballers
Living people
1982 births
Association football forwards
Palestine international footballers